Orthotylus creticus is a species of bug from a family of Miridae that is endemic to Crete.

References

Insects described in 1977
Hemiptera of Europe
Endemic arthropods of Crete
creticus